Kirk Whalum (born July 11, 1958) is an American R&B and smooth jazz saxophonist and songwriter. He toured with Whitney Houston for more than seven years and soloed in her single "I Will Always Love You", the best-selling single by a female artist in music history. He was also featured on many Luther Vandross albums, most often playing on the singer's covers of older pop and R&B standards such as "Anyone Who Had a Heart", "I (Who Have Nothing)", and "Love Won't Let Me Wait".

Whalum has recorded a series of well received solo albums and film soundtracks, with music ranging from pop to R&B to smooth jazz. His musical accomplishments have brought him a total of 12 Grammy nominations. He won his first Grammy award in 2011 for Best Gospel Song ("It's What I Do", featuring Lalah Hathaway) alongside lifelong friend and writer Jerry Peters.

Biography

Kirk Whalum was born in Memphis, Tennessee. He attended Melrose High School and Texas Southern University, where he was a member of the renowned Ocean of Soul Marching Band. In addition to singing in his father's church choir, Whalum learned to love music from his grandmother, Thelma Twigg Whalum, a piano teacher, and two uncles, Wendell Whalum and Hugh "Peanuts" Whalum, who performed with jazz bands around the country. He told John H. Johnson's magazine Ebony Man in a 1994 profile, "The music I like to play and write encompasses the four elements I grew up with: Memphis R&B, gospel, rock, and jazz. The emphasis, though, is on melody, period."

In 1986, he performed at Jean Michel Jarre's giant concerts Rendez-Vous Houston and Rendez-Vous Lyon. At each concert, he performed the track "Last Rendez-Vous," also known as "Ron's Piece," in place of Jarre and Whalum's mutual friend, saxophonist and astronaut Ron McNair, who died in the Challenger disaster.

Whalum recorded a duet with R&B singer, Jevetta Steele called "Love is a Losing Game" in 1993.

Whalum has worked on a number of film scores, including for The Prince of Tides, Boyz n the Hood, The Bodyguard, Grand Canyon and Cousins. He toured with Whitney Houston for more than seven years and soloed in her single "I Will Always Love You", the best-selling single by a female artist in music history. He was also featured on many Luther Vandross albums, most often playing on the singer's covers of older pop and R&B standards such as "Anyone Who Had a Heart", "I (Who Have Nothing)", and "Love Won't Let Me Wait".

Whalum has recorded a series of well received solo albums and film soundtracks, with music ranging from pop to R&B to smooth jazz. His musical accomplishments have brought him a total of 12 Grammy nominations. He won his first Grammy award in 2011 for Best Gospel Song ("It's What I Do", featuring Lalah Hathaway) alongside lifelong friend and writer Jerry Peters.
In 2005 Whalum recorded the Babyface Songbook (2005) with R&B icon Babyface's best songs of the past 15 years, including "Exhale (Shoop Shoop)," "I'll Make Love to You," "When Can I See You," and others. Joining in the intimate and stylish proceedings are other smooth jazz notables, including trumpeter Rick Braun, soprano saxophone player Dave Koz, and guitarists Norman Brown and Chuck Loeb among others. That same year, he also performed a cover "Any Love" on the album Forever, For Always, For Luther, which included other smooth jazz greats, like the aforementioned Dave Koz, bassist Marcus Miller, tenor saxophonist Richard Elliot and alto saxophonist Mindi Abair covering Vandross' well-known songs. Whalum also contributed to the 2008 documentary film Miss HIV.

On June 20, 2014, Whalum was the inaugural Jazz Legend honoree of the National Museum of African American Music in Nashville, Tennessee.  In September 2015, it was announced that Whalum would be joining the faculty of Visible Music College in Memphis, Tennessee. In September 2018 he received the coveted honor of a Brass Note on Historic Beale Street in his native Memphis.

Personal life 
Whalum married his wife Rubystyne (Ruby) in 1980. They have four children, including musician and marathoner Kyle, as well as Courtney, Kori, and Evan. Whalum converted to Catholicism in 2022, after having served for years as a Protestant minister. He has also been a volunteer barber at a Catholic Worker house in Memphis.

Discography

Studio albums 
Floppy Disk (1985)
And You Know That (1988)
The Promise (1989)
Caché (1993)
In This Life (1995)
Joined at the Hip w/ Bob James (1996)
Colors (1997)
For You (1998)
Unconditional (2000)
Hymns in the Garden (2001)
The Christmas Message (2001)
Groovin w/ BWB (Braun, Whalum, Brown) (2002) 
Into My Soul (2003)
Kirk Whalum Performs the Babyface Songbook (2005)
Roundtrip (2007)
Promises Made: The Millennium Promise Jazz Project (2008)
Everything is Everything: The Music of Donny Hathaway (2010)
More of Everything is Everything - ep (2010)
Romance Language (2011)
Human Nature w/ BWB (Braun, Whalum, Brown) (2013)
BWB w/ BWB (Braun, Whalum, Brown) (2016)
#Lovecovers (2017)
Humanite (2019)

The Gospel According to Jazz Series - Live 
The Gospel According to Jazz: Chapter I (1998)
The Gospel According to Jazz: Chapter II (2002)The Gospel According to Jazz Chapter III (2010)The Gospel According to Jazz Chapter IV" (2014)

 Live albums 
 Live from the Detroit Jazz Festival 2013 (2014)

 Collections The Best of Kirk Whalum (2002)Ultimate Kirk Whalum (2007)

 Singles 
"Mad About the Wolf" from Simply Mad About the Mouse (1991)

As sideman
With Joey DeFrancescoWhere Were You?'' (Columbia, 1990)

References

External links
https://archive.today/20140624174441/http://nmaam.org/celebration-of-legends/ [dead link - 8/31/2017]
"My Music Matters: Tribute to NMAAM 2014 Jazz Legend Kirk Whalum"

Mack Avenue Artist Page
“In Black America; Kirk Whalum,” 1992-10-01, KUT Radio, American Archive of Public Broadcasting

1958 births
Living people
American jazz saxophonists
American male saxophonists
Jazz fusion saxophonists
African-American songwriters
American performers of Christian music
Smooth jazz saxophonists
Musicians from Memphis, Tennessee
Songwriters from Tennessee
The Rippingtons members
21st-century American saxophonists
Jazz musicians from Tennessee
21st-century American male musicians
American male jazz musicians
Fourplay members
BWB (band) members
Mack Avenue Records artists
Warner Records artists
21st-century African-American musicians
20th-century African-American people
American male songwriters
African-American Catholics
Memphis Theological Seminary alumni